Kollenbach is a river in Beckum, North Rhine-Westphalia, Germany. It is a headwater of the Werse.

See also
List of rivers of North Rhine-Westphalia

References

Rivers of North Rhine-Westphalia
Rivers of Germany